Elmore railway station is located on the Deniliquin line in Victoria, Australia. It serves the town of Elmore, and it opened on 19 September 1864 as Runnymede. It was renamed Elmore on 1 November 1876.

History

Elmore opened on 19 September 1864, along with the line to Echuca. The station, like the township itself, was named after the Elmore Estate, which was part of the Burnewang pastoral run. The name was possibly inspired by the English town of Elmore, Gloucestershire.

In 1916, a 70 ft. turntable was provided at the station. The siding leading to the turntable was abolished in 1957. In 1976, a siding leading to the dock platform was abolished.

The station was the junction for a short branch line to Cohuna. The line opened on 10 November 1915, and it closed in 1981, with the connection to the line removed by July 1988.

In 2016/2017, the station was recorded as the least used railway station in Victoria, with an average of 2.42 boardings per day.

Disused stations Avonmore, Wellsford, Bagshot and are located between Elmore and Bendigo.

Platforms and services

Elmore has one platform. It is serviced by V/Line Echuca line services.

Platform 1:
 services to Southern Cross and Echuca

Transport links

Elmore is serviced by V/Line road coach services between Bendigo and Moama.

References

External links
Victorian Railway Stations gallery
Melway map at street-directory.com.au

Regional railway stations in Victoria (Australia)